Friedrich Wilhelm Franke (21 June 1862 – 3 April 1932) was a German organist.

Born in Barmen (today a district of Wuppertal), Franke worked as a teacher for pipe organ, harmony and counterpoint at the Hochschule für Musik und Tanz Köln. Among other things, he was organist of the Gürzenich Orchestra Cologne and numerous Rhenish music festivals. His life's work was dedicated to the efforts of renewal within the evangelical church music. He has rendered outstanding services to the revival of old Protestant forms of church music. Among his students were the church musicians Father  OSB and Alfred Sittard.

Franke died in Cologne at the age of 69.

Further reading 
 Lorna Kay Lutz: Friedrich Wilhelm Franke – Seine Bedeutung in d. Kirchenmusik. Volk, Cologne 1970 (Beiträge zur rheinischen Musikgeschichte; Issue. 91)

References 

German classical organists
1862 births
1932 deaths
Musicians from Wuppertal
Academic staff of the Hochschule für Musik und Tanz Köln